This list combines the statistics and records of the seven CFL American teams from 1993 to 1995: Baltimore Stallions, Birmingham Barracudas, Las Vegas Posse, Memphis Mad Dogs, Sacramento Gold Miners, San Antonio Texans, and the Shreveport Pirates. Though no city lasted more than 2 years in the CFL, they combined for 10 seasons of team statistics, including several record breaking performances.

Scoring 

Most points – CFL USA Career
406 – Roman Anderson (1994–95)
385 – Carlos Huerta (1994–95)

Most Points – Season
235 – Roman Anderson – San Antonio – 1995
228 – Carlos Huerta – Baltimore – 1995
184 – Donald Igwebuike – Baltimore - 1994
171 – Roman Anderson – Sacramento – 1994
157 – Carlos Huerta – Las Vegas – 1993
156 – Jim Crouch – Sacramento – 1993
144 – Luis Zendejas – Birmingham – 1995

Most Points – Game
30 – Martin Patton – Shreveport versus Winnipeg, August 5, 1995

Most Touchdowns – CFL USA Career
34 – Mike Pringle

Most Touchdowns – Season
18 – Chris Armstrong – Baltimore - 1994

Most Touchdowns – Game
5 – Martin Patton – Shreveport versus Winnipeg, August 5, 1995

Passing 

Most Passing Yards – CFL USA Career 
13,834 – David Archer (1993–95)
7705 – Tracy Ham (1994–95)

Most Passing Yards – Season
6023 – David Archer – Sacramento – 1993
4911 – Matt Dunigan – Birmingham – 1995
4471 – David Archer – San Antonio – 1995
4348 – Tracy Ham – Baltimore – 1994
3767 – Billy Joe Tolliver – Shreveport - 1995
3357 – Tracy Ham – Baltimore – 1994
3340 – David Archer – Sacramento - 1994
3211 – Damon Allen – Memphis - 1995
2582 – Anthony Calvillo – Las Vegas – 1994
1812 – Kerwin Bell – Sacramento - 1994
1259 – Mike Johnson – Shreveport – 1994
1222 – Len Williams – Las Vegas – 1994
1193 – Rickey Foggie – Memphis - 1995
1046 – Terrence Jones – Shreveport - 1994

Most Passing Yards – Game
551 - Anthony Calvillo – Las Vegas versus Ottawa, Sept. 3, 1994

Most Passing Touchdowns – CFL USA Career 
86 – David Archer (1993–95)
51 – Tracy Ham (1994–95)
34 – Matt Dunigan (1995)

Most Passing Touchdowns – Season
35 – David Archer – Sacramento - 1993
34 – Matt Dunigan – Birmingham - 1995
30 – Tracy Ham – Baltimore – 1994
30 – David Archer – San Antonio – 1995

Most Passing Touchdowns – Game
???

Rushing 

Most Rushing Yards – CFL USA Career 
4,131 – Mike Pringle (1994–95)

Most Rushing Yards – Season (all 1000 yard rushers included)
1972 – Mike Pringle – Baltimore - 1994
1791 – Mike Pringle – Baltimore – 1995
1230 – Troy Mills – Sacramento – 1994
1040 – Martin Patton – Shreveport -1995
1030 – Mike Saunders – San Antonio - 1995

Most Rushing Yards – Game
232 – Mike Pringle – Baltimore versus Shreveport, Sep. 3, 1994
230 – Troy Mills – Sacramento versus Ottawa, Oct. 24, 1994

Receiving 

Most Receiving Yards – CFL USA Career 
2,697 – Chris Armstrong (1994–95)
2,677 – Rod Harris (1993–94)

Most Receiving Yards – CFL USA Season 
1586 – Chris Armstrong – Baltimore – 1994
1559 – Marcus Grant – Birmingham – 1995
1415 – Joe Horn – Memphis – 1995
1397 - Rod Harris – Sacramento – 1993
1280 - Rod Harris – Sacramento – 1994
1202 - Curtis Mayfield – Las Vegas – 1994
1111 – Chris Armstrong – Baltimore - 1995
1101 – Jason Phillips – Birmingham – 1995
1074 – Titus Dixon – Sacramento – 1993

Most Receiving Yards – Game
319 – Curtis Mayfield – Las Vegas versus Ottawa, September 3, 1994

Most Receptions – CFL USA Career 
184 – Rod Harris (1993–95)

Most Receptions – Season
90 - Rod Harris – Sacramento – 1993
86 - Rod Harris – Sacramento – 1994
84 – Marcus Grant – Birmingham – 1995
76 – Jason Phillips – Birmingham – 1995
72 – Chris Armstrong – Baltimore – 1994
71 – Joe Horn – Memphis – 1995
64 – Chris Armstrong – Baltimore - 1995
61 – Titus Dixon – Sacramento – 1993
61 - Curtis Mayfield – Las Vegas - 1994
61 – Troy Mills - Sacramento - 1994
60 – Mark Stock – San Antonio – 1995
58 - Curtis Mayfield – Shreveport - 1995

Most Receptions – Game
14 - Curtis Mayfield – Las Vegas versus Ottawa, September 3, 1994

References 
 
 CFL Record Book 2009
 CFL Record Book 2018
 CFL website

Canadian football in the United States
Canadian Football League records and statistics